Me! I'm Afraid of Virginia Woolf is a 1978 television play by Alan Bennett, produced by London Weekend Television and directed by Stephen Frears. The title of the play is a parody of Who's Afraid of Virginia Woolf?, which in turn plays on the title of the Disney song "Who's Afraid of the Big Bad Wolf?".

Plot
It tells the story of Trevor (Neville Smith), a teacher of English Literature to adults in the evenings. Trevor is not a happy man; his girlfriend gets her hair in her muesli, someone has vandalised his visual aids for his evening classes, drawing a large pair of breasts on his poster of Virginia Woolf and a big cigar in the mouth of E. M. Forster on the other; he suffers from 'curate's bladder' and is unable to urinate if there is another man present in the toilet; and he does not even like his name—Trevor. Most of his students are hopeless but there is one bright working-class man in the class. After an unpleasant evening during which he gets punched in the face he meets the bright student, Skinner (Derek Thompson), by chance.  Skinner addresses him as 'Trev' and this cheers him up greatly, making him see himself in a new light. It is hinted that there might be a future gay romance between Trevor and Skinner.

Cast
Alan Bennett - Narrator
Neville Smith - Hopkins
Julie Walters - Woman in Waiting Room
Frank Middlemass - Doctor
Robert Longden - Mr Willard
Thora Hird - Mrs Hopkins
Carol MacReady - Wendy
Margaret Courtenay - Mrs Broadbent
Lynne Carol - Mrs Tucker
Barbara Hicks - Miss Gibbons
Janine Duvitski - Maureen
Derek Thompson - Skinner
Hugh Lloyd - Mr Dodds

References

1978 plays
1978 television films
1978 LGBT-related films
1978 films
Films scored by George Fenton
Films directed by Stephen Frears
ITV television dramas
Plays by Alan Bennett
Cultural depictions of Virginia Woolf